Allsvenskan 2003, part of the 2003 Swedish football season, was the 79th Allsvenskan season played. The first match was played 5 April 2003 and the last match was played 26 October 2003. Djurgårdens IF won the league ahead of runners-up Hammarby IF, while Östers IF and Enköpings SK were relegated.

Participating clubs

League table

Results

Relegation play-offs 

2–2 on aggregate. GIF Sundsvall won on away goals.

Season statistics

Top scorers

Attendances

References 

Print
 
 
 

Online
 
 
 
 

Allsvenskan seasons
Swed
Swed
1